Buena Vodka Social Club is a 2011 studio album by the Leningrad Cowboys.

Track listing

Personnel
Ville Tuomi : lead vocals
Sakke Järvenpää : vocals
Varre Vartiainen : guitar
Pauli Hauta-aho : guitar
Timo Tolonen : bass
Sami Järvinen : drums
Okke Komulainen : keyboards, accordion
Tume Uusitalo : vocals, guitar
Pemo Ojala : trumpet, mitten
Pope Puolitaival : saxophone
Jay Kortehisto : trombone
Anna Sainila : dancer, vocals
Hanna Moisala : dancer, vocals

References

External links

2011 albums
Leningrad Cowboys albums